Arthur Dominique Josclyn Pitcher (born 20 November 1981) is a Bermudian cricketer. He is a right-arm medium-fast bowler and right-handed batsman.

References

1981 births
Living people
Bermudian cricketers
Bermuda One Day International cricketers